Stéphane Grichting (born 30 March 1979 in Sierre) is a Swiss former professional football defender.

He earned 36 caps for the Swiss national team, and was called up to the 2006 FIFA World Cup and 2010 FIFA World Cup squads. He was in the squad for the 2004 European Football Championship, but pulled out due to injury.

After Switzerland beat Turkey in the deciding qualifier to 2006 FIFA World Cup, he was injured in the riots that occurred after the match.

At the end of the 2014–15 season, he retired from professional football at the age of 36.

International goals

|-
|1||5 September 2009||St. Jakob-Park, Basel, Switzerland||||1–0||2–0||2010 WCQ
|}

References

External links
 
 
 

1979 births
Living people
Association football defenders
Swiss men's footballers
Switzerland international footballers
Switzerland under-21 international footballers
Swiss expatriate footballers
FC Sion players
AJ Auxerre players
Grasshopper Club Zürich players
Swiss Super League players
Ligue 1 players
2006 FIFA World Cup players
UEFA Euro 2008 players
2010 FIFA World Cup players
Expatriate footballers in France
People from Sierre
Sportspeople from Valais